Latif is a common Muslim given name (see article for a list of persons with the name).

Latif or Lateef may also refer to:

Media

Television
 TvOne (Indonesia), previously name Lativi, Television in Indonesia

Places 
Latif, Hamadan, a village in Iran
Latif, Khuzestan, a village in Iran
Latif, Lorestan, a village in Iran

Other uses 
Lateef (film), a 2015 Indian film
Latif (video game player), a Saudi-American fighting games player
Latif (singer/songwriter), an American rhythm and blues singer
Isaac ibn Latif, a Jewish neoplatonist philosopher

See also 
Latifabad, a town near Hyderabad in the Pakistani province of Sindh
Latifiya, an Iraqi city south of Baghdad
Latifa (disambiguation)
Latife (disambiguation)
Lateef (disambiguation)
Latifi (disambiguation)